The Pill Hill Historic District is a historic district roughly bounded by Boylston Street, Pond Ave., and Acron, Oakland and Highland Roads in Brookline, Massachusetts.

History 

The district, which is mainly residential, was developed in the mid-19th century for an upper-middle class professional population. Commuter railroads connecting Brookline to Boston opened in 1848, making the town attractive for working professionals who wished to live in a more open suburban area. Several major Boston architects designed homes in the district, including Robert Swain Peabody, Walter H. Kilham, Ware & Van Brunt, and William Ralph Emerson. By the 1880s, a significant number of doctors had settled in the district, giving it its current name. Dr. Walter Channing, one of the doctors living in the district, established one of Boston's earliest women's hospitals; his efforts inspired Brookline's Free Hospital for Women, which moved to Pill Hill in 1895.

The district was added to the National Register of Historic Places in 1977.

See also
National Register of Historic Places listings in Brookline, Massachusetts

References

Brookline, Massachusetts
Historic districts in Norfolk County, Massachusetts
Queen Anne architecture in Massachusetts
National Register of Historic Places in Brookline, Massachusetts
Historic districts on the National Register of Historic Places in Massachusetts